Speed Center was a motor sports news program on Speed Channel. Debuting on February 13, 2011, it was anchored by Adam Alexander with Jeff Hammond and Sam Hornish Jr. as analysts on Sunday episodes. Ricky Rudd was the analyst for the first two races at Daytona and Phoenix.

History
Speed Center and its predecessors were a staple of Speed Channel since the network opened as SpeedVision in 1996. Among the names were Speedvision News RaceWeek (1996 – February 2002), Speed News (February 2002 – July 30, 2006), and The Speed Report (August 6, 2006 – January 30, 2011). The show was first known as SpeedVision News Race Week featuring anchors such as Dave Despain and Bob Varsha. Prior to The Speed Report arriving in August 2006, the show was called Speed News, with anchors including Bob Varsha, Ralph Sheheen, Bob Jenkins, Connie LeGrand, and Krista Voda. On January 23, 2008 it was announced that Manske was leaving Speed Channel to become the new host of NASCAR Now on ESPN. Drew Johnson also had his last day with Manske on January 27, 2008. For the 2008 season, the new hosts were Bob Varsha and on a part-time basis, Leigh Diffey and Krista Voda. In 2011, the program's name was changed to Speed Center. The first episode took place on February 13, 2011 with Adam Alexander hosting. The final episode of Speed Center aired on August 11, 2013 as the show was canceled on June 25, 2013 due to the transition of Speed into Fox Sports 1 on August 17, 2013.

Former hosts

Adam Alexander – Host (2011–2013)
Sam Hornish Jr. – Color Co-Host (2012–2013)
Ray Evernham –  Color Co-Host (2011 only)
Dave Despain
Drew Johnson
Connie LeGrand – 2002 to June 25, 2006
Bob Jenkins – March 2005 to May 2006  
Nicole Manske – July 2, 2006 to January 27, 2008
Ralph Sheheen – c. 2004
Bob Varsha – Part-time when Alexander was hosting NASCAR on TNT
Krista Voda

References

1990s American television news shows
2000s American television news shows
2010s American television news shows
Automotive television series
Speed (TV network) original programming
NASCAR on television
1996 American television series debuts
2013 American television series endings